The men's basketball tournament at the 2018 Commonwealth Games was held on the Gold Coast, Australia from April 5 to 15. The basketball competition was held at three venues: Cairns Convention Centre in Cairns, Townsville Entertainment and Convention Centre in Townsville for the preliminaries and the Gold Coast Convention and Exhibition Centre on the Gold Coast for the finals. This was the second time that the basketball competition was held at the Commonwealth Games. A total of eight men's competed (96 athletes, at 12 per team) in each respective tournament.

Venues 
Three venues in Queensland were used. All seat 5,000 for the basketball competitions.

Qualification
A total of eight men's teams qualified to compete at the games. At least four out of the six Commonwealth regions were considered to be represented in each tournament, if possible. For the home nations, each country may compete, however the ranking of Great Britain was given to the home nation with the most players on the team. The teams were officially confirmed on July 28, 2017.

Rosters 

At the start of tournament, all eight participating countries had up to 12 players on their rosters.

Competition format
The tournament was held under an unusual, seeded-group format.

The host nation, along with the top three teams in the FIBA Rankings played in higher group, group A. The other four teams played in the lower group, group B.

The top two teams in group A after the preliminary round advanced to the semifinals, while third and fourth place entered the quarterfinals where they played  the top two teams in group B from the preliminary round. The bottom two teams in group B were eliminated. The winners of the quarterfinals proceeded to meet the semifinalists in a straight knockout format.

Medalists

Results
All times are Australian Eastern Standard Time (UTC+10)

Preliminary round

Pool A

Pool B

Medal round

Qualifying finals

Semifinals

Bronze medal match

Gold medal match

Final standings

References 

2018